W. H. Chamberlin or W. H. Chamberlain may refer to:

William Henry Chamberlin (1897–1969), American historian and journalist
William Henry Chamberlin (philosopher) (1870–1921), American Mormon philosopher and theologian
William H. Chamberlain (1931–1972), American politician from Illinois

See also
Chamberlin (surname)
Chamberlain (surname)